Yuri Rose (born 8 May 1979) is a Dutch football manager and former player. He is currently the head coach of the Ajax under-17 team.

Club career
Rose played for FC Volendam, Heracles Almelo, SC Heerenveen, Sparta Rotterdam, De Graafschap, before ending his professional career with SC Cambuur.

He then joined Ajax Zaterdag the amateur team of Ajax Amsterdam where he was active until 2015. He went on to play 1 more match after retiring for AFC. Rose trained with the club twice a week and later confirmed, that he had an agreement with AFC manager Bart Logchies, that he could always call him if it was needed.

Coaching career
After retiring, Rose began as a manager for Amsterdamsche FC's U17 team  and later the U19 team. In the summer of 2017, Rose became the manager of OFC Oostzaan, combining it with a role at Ajax as an individual youth coach for the U17 and U19 squad on a part-time basis.

On 30 January 2018, it was confirmed that Rose had been appointed manager of Ajax Zaterdag from the 2018–19 season on a two-year deal. In June 2020, he was appointed manager of the Ajax under-17 team.

Honours
De Graafschap
 Eerste Divisie: 2009–10

Cambuur
 Eerste Divisie: 2012–13

Individual
 KNVB Cup Golden Boot: 2003–04

References

External links
 Player profile – Sparta Rotterdam
 Career stats – Voetbal International 

1979 births
Living people
People from Purmerend
Dutch footballers
Dutch football managers
Association football midfielders
FC Volendam players
Heracles Almelo players
SC Heerenveen players
Sparta Rotterdam players
Eredivisie players
Eerste Divisie players
Derde Divisie players
De Graafschap players
SC Cambuur players
AFC Ajax (amateurs) players
AFC Ajax non-playing staff
Footballers from North Holland